The Cadillac DTS is a full-size, four-door, front-drive, five or six passenger luxury sedan that was manufactured and marketed over a single generation for model years 2006–2011 by Cadillac, using GM's G-platform. The DTS debuted at the 2005 Chicago Auto Show and was manufactured at GM's Detroit/Hamtramck Assembly factory.  

The DTS was a very mildly revised iteration of the eight generation Deville, using the brand's new naming convention, set by the CTS and STS. Production ended in May 2011.

Writing for the Los Angeles Times, noted reviewer Warren Brown called the DTS "a large, exceptionally comfortable front-wheel-drive luxury sedan."
  The nameplate DTS is an acronym for DeVille Touring Sedan.

Production and specifications
 

Compared to its Deville predecessor, the DTS was mildly restyled rather than fully redesigned, featuring revised front-end sheet metal, front fascia, as well as rear decklid, rear quarter, and rear fascia. 

The DTS used GM's G-platform, as denoted by the 4th letter in the VIN), and was powered by a transverse 32V Northstar V8, which produced  in  "Standard", "Luxury" and "Premium" trims. The DTS Platinum was equipped with  version. 
  
The base MSRP for the DTS at time of introduction was US$41,195 which was over 10% lower than the DeVille model it had replaced. 

The DTS offered front bucket seats with overall seating for five passengers, and six passenger (i.e., front bench) seating available as an optional feature. 

Standard features included multiple airbags, bi-functional xenon high-intensity discharge HID headlamps, leather seating surfaces, and power seats. Optional equipment included heated and cooled front seats and a heated rear seat, rain-sensing wipers, Bose audio system, DVD navigation, automatic dimming headlights, adaptive cruise control and Magnetic Ride Control suspension.  A Platinum package became available in 2007 with special interior trim, badging, and other amenities.

GM phased out its small GM fender badges for all its vehicles, starting during the 2010 model year, including those on the DTS.

DTS-L

Especially for the limousine market, the lightly stretched DTS-L was released in November 2006 for the 2007 model year. Developed and finished by Accubuilt, this version was being touted as having greater rear legroom. Early DTS-L Cadillacs are easily recognized by the wider rear C-pillar, similar to the one used on the older Fleetwood 75 Series. This was necessitated by the use of the standard length DTS rear door, which left a strange-looking space between the rear wheelwell and door. In 2008 a new version, with longer rear doors, was introduced. This change also meant that the C-pillars became considerably slimmer. Despite these efforts, the low production DTS-L soon disappeared from the marketplace.

Other uses

The DTS was available as a 'coachbuilder' chassis for aftermarket conversion into either limousines, or hearses. The limousine model was designated V4U, and the hearse model was designated B9Q. These were only available to manufacturers named as Cadillac Master Coachbuilders, meaning they were certified by General Motors to modify them. The coachbuilder chassis are an incomplete car, with no rear doors, trunk, rear windshield, and other parts not used during the conversion. These models also included 8 lug wheels, upgraded suspension components, as well as a transmission cooler.

Presidential State Car

A specially designed and outfitted armored vehicle with Cadillac DTS styling (actually a modified medium-duty GMC truck four-wheel drive chassis) with extra high-roof was debuted in the second inauguration of U.S. President George W. Bush, which also served as the debut for the DTS before its official debut at the Chicago Auto Show. While details of the modified vehicle, codenamed "Stagecoach", remain classified, previous such vehicles indicate that it would have been upgraded with advanced armor and safety features in order to protect the president from various threats.

Shorter-wheelbase armored DTSes are also cars used by the Vice President of the United States at least since 2010.

A modified DTS was also used by former Prime Minister of Canada Stephen Harper.

Yearly American sales

Next generation
The next full-size front-wheel drive Cadillac sedan was the XTS which went on sale in June 2012 as a 2013 model.  A second full-size sedan, the rear-wheel drive CT6, was added to the lineup in 2016.

Prior to bankruptcy, GM had considered a rear-drive sedan, powered by the new Ultra V8 engine (replacement for the Northstar), to bow for 2010. GM later stopped development of new North American Zeta-based models and canceled the Ultra V8 engine.

References

External links

Consumer Guide: 2006-2010 Cadillac DTS

DTS
Full-size vehicles
Luxury vehicles
Front-wheel-drive vehicles
Sedans
Cars introduced in 2005
2010s cars
Limousines
Flagship vehicles